William Edmund Image FRCS DL JP (18 May 1807 – 26 September 1903) was an English surgeon and early philatelist.

Early life
Image was born in Norwich, the younger son of the Rev. Thomas Image, Rector and Patron of Whepstead, Suffolk and a notable geologist.

Medicine
He took his medical degree in France where he lived in the house of the French surgeon M. Dupuytren. On returning to England he started work as a General Practitioner in Bury St. Edmunds, eventually becoming an acknowledged expert in forensic medicine and poisoning cases.

Philately
Image began collecting in 1859 and built a very strong collection which he sold to Thomas Tapling in 1882 for £3000. Image's collection was more complete than Tapling's, who at first intended to sell his own collection, but who in the end decided to retain both. The Tapling Collection now forms part of the British Library Philatelic Collections.

In 1886, Image donated a collection of philatelic literature to The Philatelic Society, London, now The Royal Philatelic Society, London which was one of the cornerstones of that organisation's library. He had joined the society on 10 April 1869.

Later life
In retirement he became a Justice of the Peace. In 1887 he served as High Sheriff of Suffolk. He resided at Herringswell House, near Mildenhall, where he died in 1903, aged 96 years. His first wife was Desirée Catherine D'Enville, whom he married in Paris in 1830. Following her death he married Fanny Eliza Mure, daughter of Wright Thomas Squire and widow of George Mure, who also pre-deceased him. He had three sons.

References

1807 births
1903 deaths
Medical doctors from Norwich
19th-century English medical doctors
Fellows of the Royal College of Surgeons
British philatelists
High Sheriffs of Suffolk
English surgeons